The Institute of Wood Science was a British organisation that researched wood.

History
It was established in 1955. It is a research institute for the wood industry in the UK.

The Institute of Wood Science is now known as the Wood Technology Group (previously the Wood Technology Society), part of the Institute of Materials, Minerals and Mining.

Structure
It was situated in Hughenden Valley in Hughenden, north of High Wycombe west of the A4128, home of the British furniture industry. The site is also the headquarters of the Timber Research and Development Association, or TRADA. The site is also known as Trada Technology. It is not a government organisation.

TRADA is owned by Exova BM TRADA.

Function
It researches wood products. Its journal is the International Wood Products Journal.

UK timber industry
It is the UK's examining body for the UK timber trade. It organises training at its site and at The Horse Trust nearby.

See also
 Alice Holt Research Station
 Furniture Industry Research Association
 List of forest research institutes
 Forestry Commission
 Timber Trade Federation

References

External links
 Exova BM TRADA
 TRADA

1955 establishments in the United Kingdom
British furniture
British research associations
Environmental research institutes
Forest research institutes
Forestry in the United Kingdom
High Wycombe
Materials science institutes
Research institutes established in 1955
Research institutes in Buckinghamshire
Timber industry
Wycombe District